James Wilson is a fictional character, a supporting character appearing in American comic books published by Marvel Comics. He is a supporting character of the Hulk.

He was portrayed by P.J. Kerr in a cameo in the 2008 Marvel Cinematic Universe film The Incredible Hulk.

Publication history
Created by Roy Thomas and Herb Trimpe, the character made his first appearance in The Incredible Hulk (vol. 2) #131 (September 1970) as an angry young man who befriends the Hulk. During the late 1970s, he became a regular supporting character of the series, usually appearing as a friend of Bruce Banner. He was a replacement for the comic's original teen sidekick, Rick Jones, who had moved to Captain Marvel.

In The Incredible Hulk #232 (February 1979), it is revealed that Jim Wilson is the nephew of Sam Wilson, the superhero Falcon. Though this revelation occurred when Roger Stern was writing the series, Stern says that earlier Incredible Hulk writer Len Wein came up with the idea that they were related and simply didn't get around to it during his run.

Wilson was dropped from the series by 1980, and did not return until The Incredible Hulk Vol. 2 #388 (December 1991), in which it is revealed that Wilson was HIV-positive. He dies of complications from AIDS in The Incredible Hulk Vol. 2 #420 (August 1994).

Fictional character biography
James "Jim" Wilson grew up in Harlem and wanted to travel where he was often at odds with his father Gideon Wilson who worked as a Catholic minister. Wilson enlists Rick Jones to play a benefit concert at a hospice for AIDS patients. On the drive from the airport, Wilson reveals to Jones that he is HIV-positive and that his girlfriend left him. Wilson is injured while protecting Jefferson Wolfe from the assassin Speedfreek at the charity concert. Hulk rushes Wilson to a hospital. Jones and Hulk later secure evidence to send the mob boss who employed Speedfreek to prison.

Wilson is again seen in The Incredible Hulk #420 (August 1994), in which he is attacked by a mob protesting the fact that a court has ordered an HIV-infected boy to be allowed into a public school. (This is an analogy to Ryan White, where parents and teachers in Howard County, Indiana, lobbied against his school attendance before he died in April 1990.) Hulk is able to rescue Wilson from the mob, and takes him to the hi-tech medical facilities at the Mount, the secret headquarters of the Pantheon, the superhero group which Hulk is a member of. He learns that Wilson actually has AIDS, and has had it for some time. In addition to the broken ribs he sustained in the mob attack, he is suffering from Pneumocystis pneumonia and does not have long to live. Remembering the blood transfusion that the Hulk gave his cousin, Jennifer Walters (which turned her into the She-Hulk), Wilson asks Bruce Banner to give him a transfusion of his blood, hoping that the Hulk's blood would act as a cure to the virus. Banner initially refuses to take the risk of creating another monster, but eventually pretends to be giving Wilson a blood transfusion. Wilson reveals in private to Dr. Harr, the attending physician caring for him, that he was not fooled by Bruce's ruse, but played along anyway. Shortly afterward, Jim Wilson succumbs to the disease and dies.

After Wilson's death, Bruce donates a large sum of money to the hospice that Wilson worked at in order to allow them to comfortably exist for the next few decades.  
    
Gideon Wilson inexplicably blames the Hulk for Jim's death and joins Gamma Corps to seek revenge. However, he ultimately admits to himself and the Hulk that he only blamed the Hulk for his son's death in order to avoid facing his own guilt for his failures as a father.

In other media
A character named Jim Wilson has a brief appearance in The Incredible Hulk played by P.J. Kerr. He is a student at Culver University and along with his friend Jack McGee witness the battle between the Hulk and General Ross's army. He and McGee are later interviewed by WHiH World News about the events where he is the one who dubs the Hulk his name. It is unknown if this version of the character is related to Sam Wilson.

Two nephews of Sam Wilson, A. J. and Cass, are featured in The Falcon and the Winter Soldier.

References

External links
 Jim Wilson at Marvel Wiki

Comics characters introduced in 1970
Characters created by Herb Trimpe
Characters created by Roy Thomas
Marvel Comics sidekicks
Fictional African-American people
Fictional characters with HIV/AIDS
HIV/AIDS in comics
Marvel Comics male characters